The 1686 House is a fine dining restaurant in Kingston, New Hampshire, USA, that is best known for its extensive wine list and colonial decor. In 1992, it won one of the six 1992 Grand Awards for Outstanding Restaurant Wine Lists given by Wine Spectator.

The 1686 House is located in the historic district of Kingston and is one of the oldest buildings in the town. It was originally built as a residential home. The basement of the building originally had escape tunnels that were built in case of an attack by Native Americans. The long history of the building has drawn the attention of paranormal investigators, some of whom claim the building is home to ghosts.

The 1686 House has hosted political fundraisers for New Hampshire primary candidates. It also hosts other functions, including wedding receptions.

References

External links

Restaurants in New Hampshire
Houses completed in 1686
Reportedly haunted locations in New Hampshire
Kingston, New Hampshire
Houses in Rockingham County, New Hampshire
1686 establishments in New Hampshire